Mikhail Aleksandrovich Makagonov (born 6 February 1989) is a former Russian professional footballer.

Club career
He made his professional debut in the Russian Second Division in 2007 for FC Vityaz Podolsk.

References

External links
 

1989 births
Living people
Russian footballers
Association football defenders
FC Amkar Perm players
Russian Premier League players
FC Vityaz Podolsk players
FC Irtysh Omsk players
FC Dynamo Saint Petersburg players
FC Zenit-Izhevsk players